Nguyễn Thanh Hiền (born 16 April 1993) is a Vietnamese professional footballer who plays as a defender for Than Quảng Ninh in the V.League 1.

Club career

Than Quảng Ninh
Thanh Hiền joined Than Quang Ninh in February 2016.

Honours

Club
Dong Thap:
 Winners : V.League 2: 2014

International

Vietnam U23
 Third place : Southeast Asian Games: 2015

References

External links 
 

1993 births
Living people
Vietnamese footballers
Dong Thap FC players
Than Quang Ninh FC players
V.League 1 players
Vietnam international footballers
Association football fullbacks
Association football wingers
Footballers at the 2014 Asian Games
Southeast Asian Games bronze medalists for Vietnam
Southeast Asian Games medalists in football
Competitors at the 2015 Southeast Asian Games
Asian Games competitors for Vietnam